Jassy is a surname. Notable people with the surname include:

Andy Jassy (born 1968), American businessman, CEO of Amazon
David Jassy (born 1974), Swedish singer, songwriter, and producer

See also
Tassy